The Elkhart Express were an International Basketball League team based in Elkhart, Indiana. The team won the 2006 and 2007 IBL championships. The Express officially released that they were folding on January 5, 2009. On January 18, 2010, head coach and founder Daimon Beathea announced that the team would return for the 2010 season, but gym agreements had not been finalized.

2006 season
The Express played home games at North Side Gym in Elkhart, which was the home for the IBL Championship and All-Star game. The Express dominated the league for most of the season, and crowds of over 2,000 were routine. At home, the Express won the championship 119-108 over the Columbus Cyclones.

Roster

Season-by-season

2006 and 2007 IBL Champions

All-stars

2006
 Eric Brand
 Cedric Moodie

2007
 Coleco Buie
 Cedric Moodie
 Tim Pledger

References

External links
Team page on IBL Website

International Basketball League teams
Elkhart, Indiana
Defunct American Basketball Association (2000–present) teams
Basketball teams in Indiana
2006 establishments in Indiana
Basketball teams established in 2006